Calycella may refer to:
 Calycella (hydrozoan), a genus of hydrozoans in the family Campanulinidae
 Calycella (fungus) (E.M. Fries) P.A. Saccardo, 1899, a genus of fungi in the family Helotiaceae
 Calycella Quélet, 1886, a genus of fungi in the family Helotiaceae, synonym of Bisporella
 Calycella, a genus of beetles in the family Mordellidae, synonym of Calycina